The 1995–96 Pittsburgh Penguins season saw the return of Mario Lemieux after missing an entire season due to injuries. The Penguins improved to first in the Northeast Division and second overall in the Eastern Conference. In the 1996 Stanley Cup playoffs, the Penguins progressed to the Conference Finals before losing to the Florida Panthers.

Off-season

Regular season 
Mario Lemieux's return to the NHL after missing the entire 1994–95 season energized the Penguins and re-instituted the team's finesse game for the 1995–96 season. The Penguins finished second in the Eastern Conference with 102 points, leading all League teams in goals (362), even-strength goals (235), power-play goals (109), power-play percentage (25.95%) and shooting percentage while scoring 362 goals on just 2,645 shots (13.7%). Despite missing 12 regular-season games, Lemieux led the NHL in goals (69), assists (92), points (161) power-play goals (31) and shorthanded goals (8). Czech superstar Jaromir Jagr had a career year, scoring 62 goals (second in the League), 87 assists (third in the League) and 149 points (second in the League). The third 100-point scorer on the team was Ron Francis, who tallied 27 goals and 92 assists (tied for first in the NHL with Lemieux) for 119 points. Petr Nedved scored 45 goals and had 54 assists for 99 points in 80 games—he finished second in the NHL in shooting percentage, with 22.1%. Despite missing over a quarter of the season, Tomas Sandstrom also had a strong year, scoring 35 goals and picking up 35 assists for 70 points in 58 games.

Lemieux scored three goals or more in a game six times, and four goals or more in a game twice. On March 26, 1996, he scored five goals in a home game against the St. Louis Blues. Lemieux tallied two even-strength goals, two power-play goals and one short-handed goal in the game, which the Penguins won 8–4.

Season standings

Schedule and results 

|-  style="background:#cfc;"
| 1 || Oct 7 || Toronto Maple Leafs || 3–8 || Pittsburgh Penguins || 1–0–0 || 2
|-  style="background:#ffc;"
| 2 || Oct 9 || Pittsburgh Penguins || 6–6 OT || Colorado Avalanche || 1–0–1 || 3
|-  style="background:#fcf;"
| 3 || Oct 12 || Pittsburgh Penguins || 1–5 || Chicago Blackhawks || 1–1–1 || 3
|-  style="background:#cfc;"
| 4 || Oct 14 || Mighty Ducks of Anaheim || 2–5 || Pittsburgh Penguins || 2–1–1 || 5
|-  style="background:#ffc;"
| 5 || Oct 20 || Pittsburgh Penguins || 2–2 OT || Hartford Whalers || 2–1–2 || 6
|-  style="background:#fcf;"
| 6 || Oct 21 || Los Angeles Kings || 3–2 OT || Pittsburgh Penguins || 2–2–2 || 6
|-  style="background:#cfc;"
| 7 || Oct 26 || Pittsburgh Penguins || 7–5 || New York Islanders || 3–2–2 || 8
|-  style="background:#cfc;"
| 8 || Oct 28 || Pittsburgh Penguins || 5–3 || New Jersey Devils || 4–2–2 || 10
|-

|-  style="background:#cfc;"
| 9 || Nov 1 || Tampa Bay Lightning || 0–10 || Pittsburgh Penguins || 5–2–2 || 12
|-  style="background:#ffc;"
| 10 || Nov 3 || Pittsburgh Penguins || 3–3 OT || Buffalo Sabres || 5–2–3 || 13
|-  style="background:#cfc;"
| 11 || Nov 4 || Philadelphia Flyers || 4–7 || Pittsburgh Penguins || 6–2–3 || 15
|-  style="background:#cfc;"
| 12 || Nov 8 || Pittsburgh Penguins || 7–1 || Ottawa Senators || 7–2–3 || 17
|-  style="background:#cfc;"
| 13 || Nov 10 || Pittsburgh Penguins || 9–1 || San Jose Sharks || 8–2–3 || 19
|-  style="background:#fcf;"
| 14 || Nov 11 || Pittsburgh Penguins || 2–3 || Los Angeles Kings || 8–3–3 || 19
|-  style="background:#cfc;"
| 15 || Nov 14 || Dallas Stars || 2–4 || Pittsburgh Penguins || 9–3–3 || 21
|-  style="background:#cfc;"
| 16 || Nov 17 || Pittsburgh Penguins || 3–2 OT || Washington Capitals || 10–3–3 || 23
|-  style="background:#cfc;"
| 17 || Nov 18 || Washington Capitals || 0–3 || Pittsburgh Penguins || 11–3–3 || 25
|-  style="background:#fcf;"
| 18 || Nov 21 || Pittsburgh Penguins || 4–9 || New York Rangers || 11–4–3 || 25
|-  style="background:#fcf;"
| 19 || Nov 22 || New York Rangers || 4–3 || Pittsburgh Penguins || 11–5–3 || 25
|-  style="background:#cfc;"
| 20 || Nov 25 || Buffalo Sabres || 3–5 || Pittsburgh Penguins || 12–5–3 || 27
|-  style="background:#cfc;"
| 21 || Nov 28 || Ottawa Senators || 2–7 || Pittsburgh Penguins || 13–5–3 || 29
|-  style="background:#cfc;"
| 22 || Nov 30 || Pittsburgh Penguins || 9–6 || Boston Bruins || 14–5–3 || 31
|-

|-  style="background:#cfc;"
| 23 || Dec 1 || Florida Panthers || 1–2 || Pittsburgh Penguins || 15–5–3 || 33
|-  style="background:#cfc;"
| 24 || Dec 3 || Pittsburgh Penguins || 5–4 || Tampa Bay Lightning || 16–5–3 || 35
|-  style="background:#cfc;"
| 25 || Dec 5 || Pittsburgh Penguins || 6–3 || New York Islanders || 17–5–3 || 37
|-  style="background:#cfc;"
| 26 || Dec 7 || Montreal Canadiens || 5–7 || Pittsburgh Penguins || 18–5–3 || 39
|-  style="background:#cfc;"
| 27 || Dec 9 || Hartford Whalers || 0–6 || Pittsburgh Penguins || 19–5–3 || 41
|-  style="background:#fcf;"
| 28 || Dec 13 || Pittsburgh Penguins || 3–6 || Mighty Ducks of Anaheim || 19–6–3 || 41
|-  style="background:#cfc;"
| 29 || Dec 15 || Pittsburgh Penguins || 5–1 || Dallas Stars || 20–6–3 || 43
|-  style="background:#fcf;"
| 30 || Dec 17 || Pittsburgh Penguins || 5–6 || Philadelphia Flyers || 20–7–3 || 43
|-  style="background:#cfc;"
| 31 || Dec 19 || Calgary Flames || 1–7 || Pittsburgh Penguins || 21–7–3 || 45
|-  style="background:#fcf;"
| 32 || Dec 22 || Montreal Canadiens || 4–2 || Pittsburgh Penguins || 21–8–3 || 45
|-  style="background:#fcf;"
| 33 || Dec 23 || Pittsburgh Penguins || 0–1 || Montreal Canadiens || 21–9–3 || 45
|-  style="background:#cfc;"
| 34 || Dec 26 || Buffalo Sabres || 3–6 || Pittsburgh Penguins || 22–9–3 || 47
|-  style="background:#cfc;"
| 35 || Dec 28 || Hartford Whalers || 4–9 || Pittsburgh Penguins || 23–9–3 || 49
|-  style="background:#cfc;"
| 36 || Dec 30 || Florida Panthers || 5–6 || Pittsburgh Penguins || 24–9–3 || 51
|-

|-  style="background:#fcf;"
| 37 || Jan 1 || Pittsburgh Penguins || 2–4 || Washington Capitals || 24–10–3 || 51
|-  style="background:#cfc;"
| 38 || Jan 3 || Ottawa Senators || 1–4 || Pittsburgh Penguins || 25–10–3 || 53
|-  style="background:#cfc;"
| 39 || Jan 5 || Detroit Red Wings || 2–5 || Pittsburgh Penguins || 26–10–3 || 55
|-  style="background:#fcf;"
| 40 || Jan 6 || Pittsburgh Penguins || 2–3 || St. Louis Blues || 26–11–3 || 55
|-  style="background:#cfc;"
| 41 || Jan 8 || Vancouver Canucks || 5–8 || Pittsburgh Penguins || 27–11–3 || 57
|-  style="background:#fcf;"
| 42 || Jan 12 || Montreal Canadiens || 6–5 || Pittsburgh Penguins || 27–12–3 || 57
|-  style="background:#fcf;"
| 43 || Jan 13 || San Jose Sharks || 10–8 || Pittsburgh Penguins || 27–13–3 || 57
|-  style="background:#fcf;"
| 44 || Jan 16 || Colorado Avalanche || 5–2 || Pittsburgh Penguins || 27–14–3 || 57
|-  style="background:#cfc;"
| 45 || Jan 17 || Pittsburgh Penguins || 1–0 || Buffalo Sabres || 28–14–3 || 59
|-  style="background:#cfc;"
| 46 || Jan 22 || Boston Bruins || 6–7 OT || Pittsburgh Penguins || 29–14–3 || 61
|-  style="background:#cfc;"
| 47 || Jan 24 || Pittsburgh Penguins || 4–3 || Ottawa Senators || 30–14–3 || 63
|-  style="background:#cfc;"
| 48 || Jan 27 || Philadelphia Flyers || 4–7 || Pittsburgh Penguins || 31–14–3 || 65
|-  style="background:#fcf;"
| 49 || Jan 29 || Pittsburgh Penguins || 1–2 || Florida Panthers || 31–15–3 || 65
|-  style="background:#fcf;"
| 50 || Jan 31 || Pittsburgh Penguins || 1–4 || Tampa Bay Lightning || 31–16–3 || 65
|-

|-  style="background:#fcf;"
| 51 || Feb 3 || Pittsburgh Penguins || 0–3 || Detroit Red Wings || 31–17–3 || 65
|-  style="background:#cfc;"
| 52 || Feb 6 || Boston Bruins || 5–6 || Pittsburgh Penguins || 32–17–3 || 67
|-  style="background:#ffc;"
| 53 || Feb 7 || Pittsburgh Penguins || 1–1 OT || New Jersey Devils || 32–17–4 || 68
|-  style="background:#cfc;"
| 54 || Feb 10 || Chicago Blackhawks || 3–6 || Pittsburgh Penguins || 33–17–4 || 70
|-  style="background:#fcf;"
| 55 || Feb 12 || Pittsburgh Penguins || 1–4 || Toronto Maple Leafs || 33–18–4 || 70
|-  style="background:#cfc;"
| 56 || Feb 16 || Pittsburgh Penguins || 1–0 || Winnipeg Jets || 34–18–4 || 72
|-  style="background:#cfc;"
| 57 || Feb 18 || New York Rangers || 3–4 OT || Pittsburgh Penguins || 35–18–4 || 74
|-  style="background:#fcf;"
| 58 || Feb 21 || Pittsburgh Penguins || 3–6 || Buffalo Sabres || 35–19–4 || 74
|-  style="background:#cfc;"
| 59 || Feb 23 || Hartford Whalers || 4–5 || Pittsburgh Penguins || 36–19–4 || 76
|-  style="background:#fcf;"
| 60 || Feb 24 || Pittsburgh Penguins || 3–7 || Montreal Canadiens || 36–20–4 || 76
|-  style="background:#cfc;"
| 61 || Feb 27 || Pittsburgh Penguins || 7–4 || Vancouver Canucks || 37–20–4 || 78
|-  style="background:#fcf;"
| 62 || Feb 29 || Pittsburgh Penguins || 3–7 || Calgary Flames || 37–21–4 || 78
|-

|-  style="background:#cfc;"
| 63 || Mar 1 || Pittsburgh Penguins || 5–4 || Edmonton Oilers || 38–21–4 || 80
|-  style="background:#cfc;"
| 64 || Mar 5 || Winnipeg Jets || 4–9 || Pittsburgh Penguins || 39–21–4 || 82
|-  style="background:#cfc;"
| 65 || Mar 7 || Ottawa Senators || 1–5 || Pittsburgh Penguins || 40–21–4 || 84
|-  style="background:#fcf;"
| 66 || Mar 9 || New Jersey Devils || 4–3 OT || Pittsburgh Penguins || 40–22–4 || 84
|-  style="background:#fcf;"
| 67 || Mar 13 || Pittsburgh Penguins || 2–3 || Hartford Whalers || 40–23–4 || 84
|-  style="background:#fcf;"
| 68 || Mar 14 || Pittsburgh Penguins || 2–4 || Boston Bruins || 40–24–4 || 84
|-  style="background:#cfc;"
| 69 || Mar 16 || New York Islanders || 2–4 || Pittsburgh Penguins || 41–24–4 || 86
|-  style="background:#cfc;"
| 70 || Mar 21 || Edmonton Oilers || 4–5 || Pittsburgh Penguins || 42–24–4 || 88
|-  style="background:#fcf;"
| 71 || Mar 23 || Buffalo Sabres || 7–5 || Pittsburgh Penguins || 42–25–4 || 88
|-  style="background:#cfc;"
| 72 || Mar 24 || Pittsburgh Penguins || 8–2 || New York Rangers || 43–25–4 || 90
|-  style="background:#cfc;"
| 73 || Mar 26 || St. Louis Blues || 4–8 || Pittsburgh Penguins || 44–25–4 || 92
|-  style="background:#cfc;"
| 74 || Mar 28 || Pittsburgh Penguins || 3–2 || Florida Panthers || 45–25–4 || 94
|-  style="background:#cfc;"
| 75 || Mar 30 || New Jersey Devils || 1–2 || Pittsburgh Penguins || 46–25–4 || 96
|-  style="background:#fcf;"
| 76 || Mar 31 || Pittsburgh Penguins || 1–4 || Philadelphia Flyers || 46–26–4 || 96
|-

|-  style="background:#cfc;"
| 77 || Apr 4 || Washington Capitals || 2–4 || Pittsburgh Penguins || 47–26–4 || 98
|-  style="background:#cfc;"
| 78 || Apr 6 || Tampa Bay Lightning || 1–2 || Pittsburgh Penguins || 48–26–4 || 100
|-  style="background:#fcf;"
| 79 || Apr 8 || Pittsburgh Penguins || 4–5 || Hartford Whalers || 48–27–4 || 100
|-  style="background:#fcf;"
| 80 || Apr 10 || New York Islanders || 6–2 || Pittsburgh Penguins || 48–28–4 || 100
|-  style="background:#cfc;"
| 81 || Apr 11 || Pittsburgh Penguins || 5–3 || Ottawa Senators || 49–28–4 || 102
|-  style="background:#fcf;"
| 82 || Apr 14 || Pittsburgh Penguins || 5–6 || Boston Bruins || 49–29–4 || 102
|-

|- style="text-align:center;"
| Legend:       = Win       = Loss       = Tie

Playoffs 
In the 1996 Playoffs, the Penguins advanced to the third round for the first time since 1992, defeating the Washington Capitals in six games and the New York Rangers in five games. In the Eastern Conference finals, the heavily favored Penguins were upset in seven games by the defense-oriented Florida Panthers.

|-  style="background:#fcf;"
| 1 || Apr 17 || Washington Capitals || 6–4 || Pittsburgh Penguins || 16,238 || 0–1
|-  style="background:#fcf;"
| 2 || Apr 19 || Washington Capitals || 5–3 || Pittsburgh Penguins || 17,181 || 0–2
|-  style="background:#cfc;"
| 3 || Apr 22 || Pittsburgh Penguins || 4–1 || Washington Capitals || 18,130 || 1–2
|-  style="background:#cfc;"
| 4 || Apr 24 || Pittsburgh Penguins || 3–2 4OT || Washington Capitals || 18,130 || 2–2
|-  style="background:#cfc;"
| 5 || Apr 26 || Washington Capitals || 1–4 || Pittsburgh Penguins || 17,215 || 3–2
|-  style="background:#cfc;"
| 6 || Apr 28 || Pittsburgh Penguins || 3–2 || Washington Capitals || 17,256 || 4–2
|-

|-  style="background:#cfc;"
| 1 || May 3 || New York Rangers || 3–4 || Pittsburgh Penguins || 17,181 || 1–0
|-  style="background:#fcf;"
| 2 || May 5 || New York Rangers || 6–3 || Pittsburgh Penguins || 17,181 || 0–1
|-  style="background:#cfc;"
| 3 || May 7 || Pittsburgh Penguins || 3–2 || New York Rangers || 18,200 || 2–1
|-  style="background:#cfc;"
| 4 || May 9 || Pittsburgh Penguins || 4–1 || New York Rangers || 18,200 || 3–1
|-  style="background:#cfc;"
| 5 || May 11 || New York Rangers || 3–7 || Pittsburgh Penguins || 17,355 || 4–1
|-

|-  style="background:#fcf;"
| 1 || May 18 || Florida Panthers || 5–1 || Pittsburgh Penguins || 17,355 || 0–1
|-  style="background:#cfc;"
| 2 || May 20 || Florida Panthers || 2–3 || Pittsburgh Penguins || 17,181 || 1–1
|-  style="background:#fcf;"
| 3 || May 24 || Pittsburgh Penguins || 2–5 || Florida Panthers || 14,703 || 1–2
|-  style="background:#cfc;"
| 4 || May 26 || Pittsburgh Penguins || 2–1 || Florida Panthers || 14,703 || 2–2
|-  style="background:#cfc;"
| 5 || May 28 || Florida Panthers || 0–3 || Pittsburgh Penguins || 17,355 || 3–2
|-  style="background:#fcf;"
| 6 || May 30 || Pittsburgh Penguins || 3–4 || Florida Panthers || 14,703 || 3–3
|-  style="background:#fcf;"
| 7 || Jun 1 || Florida Panthers || 3–1 || Pittsburgh Penguins || 17,355 || 3–4
|-

|- style="text-align:center;"
| Legend:       = Win       = Loss

Suspensions

Injuries

Player statistics 
Skaters

Goaltenders

†Denotes player spent time with another team before joining the Penguins. Stats reflect time with the Penguins only.
‡Denotes player was traded mid-season. Stats reflect time with the Penguins only.

Awards and records

Awards

Transactions 
The Penguins have been involved in the following transactions during the 1995–96 season:

Trades

Free agents

Signings

Other

Draft picks 

Pittsburgh Penguins' picks at the 1995 NHL Entry Draft.

Draft notes
 The Pittsburgh Penguins' second-round pick went to the Los Angeles Kings as the result of a July 29, 1994, trade that sent Luc Robitaille to the Penguins in exchange for Rick Tocchet and this pick.

Farm teams 
The Hampton Roads Admirals of the East Coast Hockey League finished in fifth place in the East Division, but lost in the first round of the playoffs to the Richmond Renegades.

The Cleveland Lumberjacks of the International Hockey League (IHL) finished in third place in the Central Division, but were swept in the first round of the playoffs by the Michigan K-Wings.

References 
 Penguins on Hockey Database

Pittsburgh Penguins seasons
P
P
Pitts
Pitts